Northwave is a sporting equipment manufacturer, and was started  in Montebelluna, Italy by Gianni Piva and is owned by the Piva family.

Shoes and boots
The company first started out as a shoe manufacturer in the early 1980's, when they produced shoes for other companies. In the late 1980s when snowboarding was first starting to take form, Piva started to manufacture snowboard boots for other snowboard companies. Piva later developed his own brand of boots.

Acquisitions

Piva bought the company name, Northwave, which originally stemmed from a wind surfing company in Hood River, Oregon, United States.

In 1991 Northwave came out with its own line of snowboard boots. In the mid-1990's Northwave bought Drake bindings, which was an already established binding company. Drake bindings were viewed as very well designed and quality built, but had poor distribution. In mid-1997 Drake bindings became part of Northwave but kept its original brand name.

In 1998 Bakoda Design Logic snowboard accessories, was added to the company. Bakoda was originally started in the early 1990s by the Royes brothers. Northwave bought the company, leaving the brand with its originally established name.

Snowboards and cycling shoes
Gianni Piva had wanted to add snowboards to his company for many years, and after over 10 years of being in the snowboard industry, Northwave started Venue snowboards.

Due to the such high success in the action sports industry, Piva decided to develop cycling shoes. So, in 1993, Northwave cycling shoes started to manufacture and come in sale soon.

SOHAG HOSSAIN 
Sportswear (activewear)

References

External links
 Northwave

Shoe companies of Italy
Italian companies established in 1991
Sportswear brands
Sporting goods manufacturers of Italy
Italian brands
Shoe brands
Companies based in Veneto